Wang Jiao may refer to:

 Wang Jiao (wrestler) (born 1988), female Chinese Olympic freestyle wrestler
 Wang Jiao (wrestler, born 1994) (born 1994), female Chinese freestyle wrestler
 Wang Jiao (DotA), Chinese professional Defense of the Ancients player
 Wang Jiao (footballer) (born 1995), Chinese football player
 The Mandarin name for Mong Kok